Coleophora singreni is a moth of the family Coleophoridae. It is found in southern Russia, Turkestan and Uzbekistan.

The larvae feed on Astragalus and Ammodendron species. They create a silky, sheath-like case without a cover. The caudal end is slightly down-curved. There are oblique pubescent wrinkles on the surface and sometimes also small blackish patches along the sides of these wrinkles. The valve is two-sided. The length of the case is 12.5–15 mm and it is dull white in color. Larvae can be found at the beginning of June and (after diapause) from April to the beginning of May.

References

singreni
Moths of Europe
Moths of Asia
Moths described in 1973